Joe Feeney (21 July 1926 – 1 December 1992) was a Scottish footballer, who played as a forward in the Football League for Chester.

References

Chester City F.C. players
Sunderland A.F.C. players
Rhyl F.C. players
English Football League players
Association football forwards
1926 births
1992 deaths
Footballers from Glasgow
Scottish footballers